Daniel Mark Wolpert FRS FMedSci (born 8 September 1963) is a British medical doctor, neuroscientist and engineer, who has made important contributions in computational biology. He was Professor of Engineering at the University of Cambridge from 2005, and also became the Royal Society Noreen Murray Research Professorship in Neurobiology from 2013. He is now Professor of Neurobiology at Columbia University.

Early life and education
Wolpert was educated at the Hall School and Westminster School. He went on to the University of Cambridge to study mathematics, but after only a year he shifted to medicine, as it seemed to him "that medics were having much more fun than mathematicians." He completed a Bachelor of Arts in medical sciences in 1985, then completed his Bachelor of Medicine, Bachelor of Surgery (BM BCh) in 1988, and PhD in physiology in 1992 from the University of Oxford.

Career
Wolpert pursued computational neuroscience as postdoctoral researcher (1992–1994) and McDonnell-Pew Fellow (1994–1995) in the Department of Brain and Cognitive Sciences at Massachusetts Institute of Technology.
Daniel Wolpert on his qualification as medical doctor worked as Medical House officer in Oxford, in 1988. After completion of his research in 1995, he joined the faculty of Sobell Department of Neurophysiology, Institute of Neurology, University College London, as a Lecturer. He became Reader in Motor Neuroscience in 1999, and full Professor in 2002. He was appointed to Professor of Engineering at the Department of Engineering, University of Cambridge, in 2005. In 2013, he also became the Royal Society Noreen Murray Research Professorship in Neurobiology. In 2018, he moved to Columbia University to become Professor of Neurobiology.

Awards and honours
Wolpert was elected a Fellow of the Royal Society in 2012, his nomination reads  Other awards include:

1982–1985 Thomas Cannon Brooke's Scholarship for Mathematics, Trinity Hall, Cambridge
1989–1992 Senior Scholarship, Lincoln College, Oxford
1992–1995 Fulbright Scholarship
2004 Fellow of the Academy of Medical Sciences (FMedSci)
2005 Swartz foundation Mind-Brain Lecture, Stony Brook University
2005 Royal Society Francis Crick Prize Lecture
2005 Professorial Fellow of Trinity College, Cambridge
2007 Alice and Joseph Brooks International Lecture, Harvard University
2007 Annual Cognitive Science Lecture, Royal Netherlands Academy of Arts and Sciences
2009 Fred Kavli Distinguished International Scientist Lecture, Society for Neuroscience
2010 Golden Brain Award of the Minerva Foundation
2012 Fellow of the Royal Society (FRS)
2012 Wellcome Trust Senior Investigator Award (for seven years)
2013 Royal Society Noreen Murray Research Professorship in Neurobiology

Personal life
Wolpert is the son of South-African born developmental and evolutionary biologist Lewis Wolpert, and his wife Elizabeth (née Brownstein).

Since 1990, Wolpert has been married to Mary Anne Shorrock; they have two daughters.

References

External links

 Cambridge Research Systems Ltd.
 Think 2012 lecture
 Smart Moves: Daniel Wolpert, Motor Control and the Brain
 13th Queen Square Symposium: Interview with Professor Daniel Wolpert
 Golden Brain archive at Minerva Foundation
 Brief biography at The Conversation
 Neurotree
 

20th-century British biologists
21st-century British biologists
British neuroscientists
Alumni of Magdalen College, Oxford
Fellows of Trinity College, Cambridge
Fellows of the Royal Society
English Jews
1963 births
Living people
Professors of engineering (Cambridge, 1875)
British bioengineers
Alumni of Trinity Hall, Cambridge
Alumni of Lincoln College, Oxford
Fellows of the Academy of Medical Sciences (United Kingdom)
British physiologists
Academics of University College London
People from Hampstead